HMAS Mombah was a coal lighter and stores ship of the Royal Australian Navy (RAN) between 1923 and 1930 and later during the Second World War between 1944 and 1948.

Mombah was constructed at the Cockatoo Island Dockyard for the RAN. She was laid down on 21 October 1920 and launched on 23 April 1921. She was completed on 20 February 1923 and commissioned shortly afterwards. She was sold in 1930 to the Melbourne Harbour Trust.

In March 1944, she was requisitioned by the RAN, and she was towed by the tug Heros from Sydney to Darwin, and then to New Guinea. She was towed by the tug HMAS Reserve back to Sydney at war's end, where she was used as a merchant vessel due to a shortage of shipping available. She was sold in 1948 and towed to Port Vila and was used as a copra storage hulk. She was towed out to sea in 1968 and scuttled.

Citations

References
Wilson, Michael; Royal Australian Navy 21st Century Warships, Naval auxiliaries 1911 to 1999 including Defence Maritime Services, Profile No. 4 - Revised Edition, Topmill Pty Ltd, Marrickville. 

1921 ships
Ships built in New South Wales
Colliers of the Royal Australian Navy